Burpee and Mills is a township in the Canadian province of Ontario. It was formed on January 1, 1998, through the annexation of the unorganized geographic township of Mills by Burpee Township.

Located in the Manitoulin District, the township had a population of 343 in the 2016 Canadian census.  Industries include tourism, agriculture, aquaculture, and logging.

Communities
The township comprises the communities of Burpee, Elizabeth Bay, Evansville and Poplar.

Demographics 

See also
List of townships in Ontario

References

External links

Municipalities in Manitoulin District
Single-tier municipalities in Ontario
Township municipalities in Ontario